Chris Shields (born 27 December 1990) is an Irish professional footballer who plays as a midfielder for Linfield in the NIFL Premiership. He previously played for Bray Wanderers where he played for four seasons before joining Dundalk, where he remained for more than nine seasons.

Shields won five Premier Division medals during his time with Dundalk, in addition to three FAI Cups. He featured regularly in European competition for the club and was part of the team that became only the second-ever Irish side to reach the group stage of the Europa League in 2016 as well as reaching the same stage in 2020.

Career

Early career 
A native of Clondalkin, Shields played youth football for St Francis and spent ten years there before joining League of Ireland side Bray Wanderers where he initially played for their U20 side.

Bray Wanderers 
Shields made his senior League of Ireland debut with the first team in the final game of the 2008 season in a 2-0 defeat away to Sligo Rovers.

He became a first team player in the 2009 season and was part of a Bray side that battled to preserve its Premier Division status during his time with the club. The highlight of his time with Bray was an extraordinary promotion/relegation playoff match with Monaghan United in November 2010. Shields scored an own goal in the 119th minute which saw his side fall behind. Celebrations from Monaghan fans resulted in a perimeter wall collapsing and a long delay. When play resumed, Shields set up an equalizing goal for Bray and he then scored the winning penalty kick in the shoot-out that followed.

Dundalk 
Shields left Bray at the end of the 2011 campaign and was a free agent training with Leinster Senior League side Booth Road Celtic F.C. when then-Dundalk manager Sean McCaffrey offered him the opportunity to move to Louth as club captain.

He was part of a team that struggled badly in the 2012 season and only avoided relegation because Monaghan United went out of business during the year. McCaffrey left his post during the year, but Dundalk succeeded in staying in the topflight after winning a promotion/relegation playoff match. Shields was one of two players to stay on when new manager Stephen Kenny was appointed, although he was not retained as captain. There was a massive improvement in the 2013 Premier Division, with Dundalk finishing in second place, three points behind winners St. Pat's, and they also reached the semi-final of the FAI Cup. In 2014, Kenny guided Dundalk to the League title, winning the League of Ireland Cup in the process. Shields was an important member of that team and was an integral part of the club's success during the remainder of Kenny's time in charge. He was part of the group that made history in Europe in 2016, although they suffered disappointment the following year as Cork City won both the league and FAI Cup.

In 2018, Shields enjoyed the best season of his career and scored the decisive goal in their top of the table clash with Cork that helped them secure a fourth league win in the space of five years. His performances were recognized by his peers when he was voted onto the PFAI Team of the Year and shortlisted for the Player of the Year award which was collected by his team-mate Michael Duffy

In 2019, Shields scored the winning penalty in a shootout after a 2-2 draw with Derry City in the EA Sports Cup final.

In the 2020 Europa League third qualifying round, he scored in the penalty shoot-out against Sheriff Tiraspol helping Dundalk qualify for the playoffs. Dundalk went on to qualify for the 2020–21 UEFA Europa League group stage and he scored a goal from a penalty in Dundalk's 3-1 defeat against Rapid Vienna at the Aviva Stadium.

Linfield
On 22 June 2021, Shields joined NIFL Premiership side Linfield on a three-year contract from 1 July 2021. He scored his first goal in the 2021 Champions League qualifiers against Zalgiris Vilnius, but lost 3-1.

Career statistics
''

Honours

Club

Dundalk
 League of Ireland Premier Division (5): 2014, 2015, 2016, 2018, 2019
 FAI Cup (3): 2015, 2018, 2020
 League of Ireland Cup (3): 2014, 2017, 2019
 President's Cup (3): 2015, 2019, 2021
 Leinster Senior Cup (1): 2014–15
 Champions Cup (1): 2019

Linfield
 NIFL Premiership (1): 2021–22

Individual
 PFAI Team of the Year (2): 2018, 2019
 FAI League Player of the Year (1): 2018
 NIFL Premiership Team of the Year (1): 2021–22
 Linfield Player of the Year (1): 2021–22

References

Republic of Ireland association footballers
1990 births
Living people
Bray Wanderers F.C. players
Dundalk F.C. players
Linfield F.C. players
League of Ireland players
NIFL Premiership players
Association footballers from County Dublin
Association football midfielders